The 1976 UCI Juniors Track World Championships were the second annual Junior World Championship for track cycling held in Liège, Belgium.

The Championships had four events for men only, Sprint, Points race, Individual pursuit and Team pursuit. Robert Dill-Bundi became the first cyclist to retain a world junior title, and the first to win two gold medals in the championships.

Events

Medal table

References

UCI Juniors Track World Championships
1976 in track cycling
Track cycling
International cycle races hosted by Belgium